The Baoshan Dam is a dam located in Baoshan Township, Hsinchu County, Taiwan. The dam supplies water to Hsinchu City and cooling water to factories in Hsinchu Science and Industrial Park.

History
The dam was initially constructed in 1981 and completed in 1984.

Technical specifications
The reservoir has an effective capacity of 5,380,000 m3.

Transportation
The dam is accessible south of Shangyuan Station of Taiwan Railways.

See also
 List of dams and reservoirs in Taiwan
 Baoshan Second Dam

References

1984 establishments in Taiwan
Buildings and structures in Hsinchu County
Dams completed in 1984
Dams in Taiwan